This is a list of notable people who have been described as recluses, individuals who live in voluntary seclusion from the public and society. Excluded are religious hermits.

People

Fictional characters

References

Recluses